The 2017 Dalian Women's Tennis Open was a professional tennis tournament played on hard courts. It was the third edition of the tournament which was part of the 2017 WTA 125K series and took place in Dalian, China, from 5 to 10 September 2017.

Singles draw entrants

Seeds 

 1 Rankings are as of 28 August 2017.

Other entrants 
The following players received wildcards into the singles main draw:
  Lu Jiajing
  Yuan Yue
  Zhang Kailin
  Zheng Wushuang

The following players received entry using protected rankings:
  Vitalia Diatchenko
  Rebecca Peterson
  Vera Zvonareva

The following players received entry from the qualifying draw:
  Beatrice Gumulya
  Wang Meiling
  You Xiaodi
  Zhang Yuxuan

The following players received entry as a lucky loser:
  Hiroko Kuwata
  Erika Sema

Withdrawals
Before the tournament
  Ana Bogdan →replaced by  Riko Sawayanagi
  Beatriz Haddad Maia →replaced by  Danielle Collins
  Nao Hibino →replaced by  Jang Su-jeong
  Hsieh Su-wei →replaced by  Peangtarn Plipuech
  Aleksandra Krunić →replaced by  Gao Xinyu
  Christina McHale →replaced by  Jana Fett
  Risa Ozaki →replaced by  Dalila Jakupović
  Evgeniya Rodina →replaced by  Sabina Sharipova
  Wang Yafan →replaced by  Erika Sema
  Yanina Wickmayer →replaced by  Hiroko Kuwata
  Zheng Saisai →replaced by  Liu Fangzhou
  Zhu Lin →replaced by  Lu Jingjing

Doubles draw entrants

Seeds 

 1 Rankings are as of 28 August 2017.

Champions

Singles 

  Kateryna Kozlova def.  Vera Zvonareva, 6–4, 6–2

Doubles 

  Lu Jingjing /  You Xiaodi def.  Guo Hanyu /  Ye Qiuyu, 7–6(7–2), 4–6, [10–5]

External links
 Official website 
 Tournament page at wtatennis.com

2017 WTA 125K series
2017
2017 in Chinese tennis